Duygulu is a village in the Ardeşen District, Rize Province, in Black Sea Region of Turkey. Its population is 274 (2021).

History 
According to list of villages in Laz language book (2009), name of the village is Tolikchet, which means "colored-eyed". Most villagers are ethnically Laz.

Geography

References

Villages in Ardeşen District
Laz settlements in Turkey